The following are the national records in Olympic weightlifting in Chinese Taipei. Records are maintained in each weight class for the snatch lift, clean and jerk lift, and the total for both lifts by the Chinese Taipei Weightlifting Association (CTWA).

Current records
Key to tables:

Men

Women

Historical records

Men (1998–2018)

Women (1998–2018)

References
General
 Taiwanese records 
Specific

External links
 CTWA web site
 CTWA records page

records
Taiwan
Olympic weightlifting
weightlifting